Andrew Boylan (born January 1939) is a former Irish Fine Gael politician. Boylan was first elected to Dáil Éireann as a Fine Gael Teachta Dála (TD) for the Cavan–Monaghan constituency at the 1987 general election, and retained his seat until losing it at the 2002 general election. He was a member of Cavan County Council and Cavan Town Council between 1991 and 2014.

References

1939 births
Living people
Fine Gael TDs
Members of the 25th Dáil
Members of the 26th Dáil
Members of the 27th Dáil
Members of the 28th Dáil
Politicians from County Cavan
People educated at Rockwell College
20th-century Irish farmers
Local councillors in County Cavan
21st-century Irish farmers